Ghanshyam Patidar (died 2 February 2019) was a former minister in the government of Madhya Pradesh in India from 1998 to 2003, and an MLA from the Jawad Constituency.

References

Madhya Pradesh politicians
2019 deaths
Year of birth missing
Madhya Pradesh MLAs 1993–1998
Madhya Pradesh MLAs 1998–2003